Luis Meléndez may refer to:

Luis Egidio Meléndez, Spanish painter
Luis Meléndez (athlete), Spanish Olympic athlete
Luis Meléndez (baseball), Puerto Rican baseball player